is a Shinto shrine located in Miyazaki, Miyazaki prefecture, Japan. It is dedicated to Emperor Ōjin and Taira no Kagekiyo.

Shinto shrines in Miyazaki Prefecture
Hachiman shrines